Lieselotte "Lotte" Berk (13 January 1913 – 4 November 2003) was a German-born dancer and teacher, who lived in England from 1938. In 1959, she developed her own method of exercise, drawing on ballet moves and positions, that concentrated on the idea of building "core stability". In the 21st century, derivatives of her method are widely offered by gyms and studios around the world as barre classes

Biography
Lotte Berk was born Lieselotte Heymansohn on 13 January 1913, in Cologne, Germany, to a German mother and Russian-born father, both of whom were Jewish. Her mother died of a stroke when Lotte was aged eight; her father, Nicolai Heymansohn, had been a tailor and owned a chain of menswear shops.

She initially studied the piano for 11 years, according to her father's wishes, but she preferred dancing and went on to train under modern dance pioneer Mary Wigman. At 18, Lotte was dancing with prominent companies, for famous choreographers and conductors including Carl Ebert, Bruno Walter and Fritz Busch, and at such events as the Salzburg Festival in Austria.

In 1933 she married a fellow dancer, Ernst Berk, and their daughter Esther was born the following year. With the rise of Nazism in the 1930s they fled Germany and because her husband had a British passport, the family was able to live in England, where Berk worked as a model at Heatherley School of Fine Art and danced at Covent Garden for Marie Rambert. Her style of dancing did not appeal to the British and she knew she would have to change careers to make a living. In the 1950s, with the help of an osteopath, she developed a series of exercises based on her experience with dancing. Similar to pilates and yoga, the Lotte Berk method concentrates on targeting specific areas for strength and flexibility training.

At the age of 46, Berk opened a women-only exercise studio: the Manchester Street Studio for Exercise. She gave certain exercises unusual names, such as "the Prostitute", "the Peeing Dog" and the "French Lavatory".

In her forties she moved in with a painter, with the permission of her husband, who suggested that she do so for two years, after which he would take her back. At the age of 50, her 30-year marriage came to an end. She married again; the second marriage lasted three weeks.

Berk continued to teach her method of exercise well into her 80s. Her clients included Joan Collins, Britt Ekland, Barbra Streisand, Siân Phillips, Edna O'Brien and Yasmin Le Bon.

Berk died aged 90 on 4 November 2003 at the Brendoncare Foundation, Froxfield, Wiltshire. She was survived by her daughter, who continued to teach her mother's method from a studio at Hungerford, in Berkshire, and wrote a biography of Berk entitled My Improper Mother and Me (Pomona, 2010).

Books
 Lotte Berk Method of Exercise (with Jean Prince), Quartet Books, 1979. 
 The Lotte Berk Method, Natural Journeys, 2003.

References

External links
 Esther Fairfax official website
 Julie Welch, Lotte Berk , The Guardian, 8 November 2003.

1913 births
2003 deaths
20th-century German women
British ballerinas
British people of Russian-Jewish descent
German ballerinas
German people of Russian-Jewish descent
Jewish emigrants from Nazi Germany to the United Kingdom
Modern dancers
People from Cologne